CNN Konek, roughly translated as CNN Connected, was the flagship late-night news program broadcast by AksyonTV. It was anchored by Cherie Mercado. The program aired every Monday to Friday from 9:30 p.m. to 10:00 p.m. (PST).

Final anchors 
Cherie Mercado - main anchor

Final Substitute Anchors
Shawn Yao 
Roices Naguit

Final segments
Balitang Hollywood
World at a Glance
Video of the Day
Balitang Health
Balitang Techie
Banda Rito

See also
CNN International
CNN Philippines
News5
List of programs aired by AksyonTV/5 Plus

References

AksyonTV original programming
2011 Philippine television series debuts
2013 Philippine television series endings